Pinnacles National Park is a protected area in the localities of Hervey Range and Granite Vale in the City of Townsville, Queensland, Australia.

Geography 
Pinnacles National Park is a  site on the ridge and eastern slopes of the Hervey Range.

History 
The park was gazetted on March 2011 as the start of an effort to protect the rugged bushland character of Townsville's scenic rim. It is named for the exposed granite batholiths.

Fauna and flora 
The park protects an endangered plant Sannantha papillosa and an endangered bird, Poephila cincta (black-throated finch).

References

External link 

 

National parks of Queensland
City of Townsville